A Thousand and One Nights (Spanish:Las mil y una noches) is a 1958 Mexican film. It was produced by  
Fernando de Fuentes.

Cast
 Germán Valdés - Ven Aquí 
 María Antonieta Pons - Ven Acá 
 Óscar Pulido - Sultán Ali Pus
 Martha Valdés - Soberana Sobeyra
 Mapita Cortés - Yamirka 
 Marcelo Chávez
 Manuel Valdés
 Miguel Arenas - Sultán de Basora
 Elena Julián
 Ramón Valdés
 Silvia Carrillo - Odalisca
 Roberto Y. Palacios
 Leticia Julián
 Antonio Valdés

External links
 

1958 films
Mexican fantasy comedy films
1950s Spanish-language films
Films scored by Manuel Esperón
1950s Mexican films